tRNA isopentenyltransferase, mitochondrial is an enzyme that in humans is encoded by the TRIT1 gene. 

It catalyzes the addition of an isopentenyl group from dimethylallyl diphosphate (DMAPP) onto adenosine residue 37 of certain tRNA molecules.

References

Further reading